Mureils is a former commune in the Drôme department in southeastern France. On 1 January 2022, it was merged into the new commune of Saint-Jean-de-Galaure.

Population

Geography
The Galaure flows southwest through the southern part of the commune.

See also
Communes of the Drôme department

References

Former communes of Drôme